Aminlu (also Romanized as Amīnlū) is a village in Hasanlu Rural District, Mohammadyar District, Naqadeh County, West Azerbaijan Province, Iran. At the 2006 census, its population was 99, in 25 families.

References 

Populated places in Naqadeh County